The Jade Cup is a 1926 American silent mystery film directed by Frank Hall Crane and starring Evelyn Brent, Jack Luden and Eugene Borden.

Cast
 Evelyn Brent as Peggy Allen
 Jack Luden as Billy Crossan
 Eugene Borden as Milano
 George Cowl as Anoine Gerhardt
 Charles Delaney as 'Dice' Morey
 Violet Palmer as Poppy

References

Bibliography
 Munden, Kenneth White. The American Film Institute Catalog of Motion Pictures Produced in the United States, Part 1. University of California Press, 1997.

External links
 

1926 films
1926 mystery films
American silent feature films
American mystery films
American black-and-white films
Film Booking Offices of America films
Films directed by Frank Hall Crane
1920s English-language films
1920s American films
Silent mystery films